Gerald Hocken Knight  (1908–1979) was a cathedral organist, who served at Canterbury Cathedral.

Background
Gerald Hocken Knight was born on 27 July 1908 in Par, Cornwall, the only son of Alwyne Knight of Par by his  first wife Edith Harvey and descended from yeomen, the Knights of Luxulyan. Gerald was educated at Truro Cathedral School and Peterhouse, Cambridge. He was an articled organ pupil of Hubert Stanley Middleton at Truro Cathedral.

Director of the Royal School of Church Music 1954-1973.

He was appointed a Fellow of the Royal School of Church Music in 1964.

Publications

Together with John Dykes Bower, he co-edited the "revised edition" of Hymns Ancient and Modern, which was published in 1950. In addition, he published the following compositions and books:

The Treasury of English Church Music. Volume one. 1100-1545. Edited by Denis Stevens, etc. 1965
Accompaniments for unison Hymn-singing. 1971
Christ whose Glory fills the Skies. [Anthem for treble voices and organ.] Words by Charles Wesley, etc. 1957
The Coventry Mass. Adapted from medieval sources. Accompaniment by G. H. Knight. 1966
Incidental Vocal Music to "The Devil to pay," Play by Dorothy L. Sayers. 1939
Incidental Music to The Zeal of Thy House, Dorothy L. Sayers. 1938
Twenty Questions on Church Music. Answered by G. H. Knight (Series. no. 3.), 1950
R.S.C.M. The first forty years. 1968

Career
Organist of:
St Augustine of Canterbury, Queen's Gate London 1931 - 1937
Canterbury Cathedral 1937 - 1953

References

1908 births
1979 deaths
English classical organists
British male organists
Cathedral organists
Hymnal editors
Alumni of Peterhouse, Cambridge
Commanders of the Order of the British Empire
People from Tywardreath and Par
People educated at Truro Cathedral School
20th-century classical musicians
20th-century English musicians
20th-century organists
20th-century British male musicians
Musicians from Cornwall
Male classical organists